Dmitry Dmitriyevich Vorobyov (born 28 November 1997) is a Russian football player who plays for FC Orenburg. He plays as either a centre-forward or a winger.

Club career
He made his debut in the Russian Professional Football League for FC Krasnodar-2 on 10 April 2014 in a game against FC Mashuk-KMV Pyatigorsk.

He has made his debut for the main FC Krasnodar squad in a 2016–17 UEFA Europa League play-off round game against FK Partizani Tirana on 25 August 2016.

In October 2018, he joined Czech club FC Hradec Králové.

On 19 July 2021, he joined Russian Premier League club PFC Sochi on loan. He made his RPL debut for Sochi on 26 July 2021 in a game against FC Nizhny Novgorod.

Career statistics

Club

References

External links
 
 

1997 births
People from Kanevskoy District
Sportspeople from Krasnodar Krai
Living people
Russian footballers
Russia youth international footballers
Association football forwards
FC Krasnodar-2 players
FC Krasnodar players
FC Hradec Králové players
FC Nizhny Novgorod (2015) players
FC Volgar Astrakhan players
FC Orenburg players
PFC Sochi players
Russian Second League players
Czech National Football League players
Russian First League players
Russian Premier League players
Russian expatriate footballers
Expatriate footballers in the Czech Republic
Russian expatriate sportspeople in the Czech Republic